Wesenberg is a town in the Mecklenburgische Seenplatte district, in Mecklenburg-Western Pomerania, Germany. It is situated 11 km southwest of Neustrelitz, at the south-west end of the Woblitzsee. Wesenberg Castle is located just outside the town.

Notable people
Heinrich Plütschau (1676–1752), one of the first Evangelical priests to India

References

External links 

Official website (German)

Cities and towns in Mecklenburg
Populated places established in the 13th century
1250s establishments in the Holy Roman Empire
1252 establishments in Europe
Grand Duchy of Mecklenburg-Strelitz